Aeollanthus is a genus in the mint family, Lamiaceae. All the species are native to Africa.

Species
 Aeollanthus abyssinicus Hochst. ex Benth. – Ethiopia
 Aeollanthus alternatus Ryding – Tanzania, Zambia
 Aeollanthus ambustus Oliv. – Central African Republic, Zaïre, South Sudan, Uganda
 Aeollanthus angolensis Ryding – Angola
 Aeollanthus angustifolius Ryding – Cameroon, Central African Republic, Nigeria
 Aeollanthus breviflorus De Wild. – Zaïre, Angola, Zambia
 Aeollanthus buchnerianus Briq. – from Zaïre and Uganda south to South Africa
 Aeollanthus candelabrum Briq. – Angola
 Aeollanthus caudatus Ryding – Angola
 Aeollanthus cucullatus Ryding – Cameroon, Nigeria
 Aeollanthus densiflorus Ryding – South Sudan, Uganda, Rwanda, Ethiopia, Kenya, Tanzania
 Aeollanthus elsholtzioides Briq. – Angola, Namibia
 Aeollanthus engleri Briq. – Cameroon, Zaïre, Angola, Zambia, Tanzania, Mozambique, Malawi
 Aeollanthus fruticosus Gürke – Zaïre, Zambia, Tanzania, Mozambique, Malawi
 Aeollanthus haumannii van Jaarsv. – Namibia
 Aeollanthus holstii Gürke – Zaïre, Tanzania, Rwanda
 Aeollanthus homblei De Wild – Zaïre, Zambia
 Aeollanthus lisowskii Ryding – Zaïre
 Aeollanthus lobatus N.E.Br. – Angola
 Aeollanthus myrianthus Baker – from Ethiopia south to Mozambique
 Aeollanthus namibiensis Ryding – Namibia
 Aeollanthus neglectus (Dinter) Launert – Angola, Zambia, Zimbabwe, Botswana, Namibia, Transvaal
 Aeollanthus paradoxus (Hua) Hua & Briq. – Senegal, Mali, Guinea
 Aeollanthus parvifolius Benth. – Mozambique, Eswatini, South Africa
 Aeollanthus petiolatus Ryding – Zaïre
 Aeollanthus pinnatifidus Hochst. ex Benth. – Ethiopia
 Aeollanthus plicatus Ryding – Angola
 Aeollanthus pubescens Benth. – western + central Africa from Liberia to Angola
 Aeollanthus rehmannii Gürke – eastern + southern Africa from Tanzania to South Africa
 Aeollanthus repens Oliv. – western Africa from Sudan to Mozambique
 Aeollanthus rivularis Hiern – Angola
 Aeollanthus rydingianus van Jaarsv. & A.E.van Wyk – Namibia
 Aeollanthus saxatilis J.Duvign. & Denaeyer – Zaïre
 Aeollanthus sedoides Hiern – Angola
 Aeollanthus serpiculoides Baker – Tanzania, Malawi, Mozambique, Zimbabwe
 Aeollanthus stuhlmannii Gürke – Tanzania
 Aeollanthus suaveolens Mart. ex Spreng. – central southern Africa
 Aeollanthus subacaulis (Baker) Hua & Briq. – central Africa from Cameroon and Tanzania south to Zimbabwe
 Aeollanthus subintegrus Ryding – Zaïre, Tanzania, Angola, Zambia
 Aeollanthus trifidus Ryding – Nigeria, Cameroon
 Aeollanthus tuberosus Hiern – Angola
 Aeollanthus ukamensis Gürke – Tanzania, Zambia, Mozambique, Zimbabwe, Malawi
 Aeollanthus viscosus Ryding – Mozambique, Zimbabwe
 Aeollanthus zanzibaricus S.Moore – Kenya, Tanzania, Somalia

References 

Lamiaceae
Lamiaceae genera
Flora of Africa